Germantown Township may refer to the following townships in the United States:

 Germantown Township, Clinton County, Illinois
 Germantown Township, Cottonwood County, Minnesota
 Germantown Township, Pennsylvania, in Philadelphia County
 Germantown Township, Turner County, South Dakota